Valley of Smoke is the third studio album by American progressive metal band Intronaut. It was released in North America on October 12, 2010 on Century Media Records, who also released their previous album Prehistoricisms. The album was released in Europe with exclusive bonus track "Vernon" on November 22, 2010.

Track listing

Personnel

Intronaut
Sacha Dunable – guitar, vocals
Dave Timnick – guitar, vocals, percussion
Danny Walker – drums
Joe Lester – bass

Guest musicians
Justin Chancellor - second bass on "Valley of Smoke"

Production
Josh Newell - producer

References

2010 albums
Intronaut albums
Century Media Records albums